The Cuban Adjustment Act (in Spanish, Ley de Ajuste Cubano), Public Law 89-732, is a United States federal law enacted on November 2, 1966. Passed by the 89th United States Congress and signed into law by President Lyndon Johnson, the law applies to any native or citizen of Cuba who has been inspected and admitted or paroled into the United States after January 1, 1959 and has been physically present for at least one year, and is admissible to the United States as a permanent resident.

Legal migration to the United States
Cubans in Cuba can legally migrate to the U.S. through various migration programs that include immigrant visa issuance, asylum, and the diversity lottery. 

Immigrant visas are issued to the parents, spouses, and unmarried children who are under 21 years of age, of U.S. citizens as soon as the immigrant visa petition is approved by the United States Citizenship and Immigration Services.

Immigrant visas are also available to a range of persons who can qualify for family or employment-based visas under the preference system that controls numerically limited immigration to the United States.

The preference system allows U.S. citizens to bring their siblings and their adult married children to the United States. Lawful permanent residents of the United States can petition for their spouses, minor children, and unmarried adult children. The waiting period for preference visas varies by category.

Those who have been persecuted in Cuba, or who fear persecution (on the basis of race, religion, nationality, membership in a particular social group, or political opinion), may apply for U.S. resettlement through its in country refugee processing unit at the United States Embassy in Havana.

The diversity visa program is also available in Cuba. There are 55,000 visas available annually to eligible applicants from around the world. For the three years that statistics are available, the success rate for Cuban applicants is quite high. In 1996 approximately 67% of those registered were issued visas, in 1997 the success rate was 69% and in 1998 a total of 73% of Cuban applicants who applied for the diversity visa program were issued visas.

The Special Cuban Migration Program, or "Cuban lottery," was open to all adult Cubans between the ages of 18 and 55 years of age who resided in Cuba regardless of whether they qualified for U.S. immigrant visa or refugee programs. The lottery provided an additional avenue of legal migration to a diverse group of Cubans, including those who might not have close relatives in the United States. The last registration period was held from June 15 to July 15, 1998.

Modifications

The original Cuban Adjustment Act of 1966 allowed Cubans to become permanent residents if they had been present in the United States for at least 2 years. The Immigration and Nationality Act Amendments of 1976 (| P.L. 94-571) reduced this time to one year.

Cubans are exempt from any immigration quotas, and are also exempt from the following requirements which are imposed on most other immigrants:
 Showing a family-based or employment-based reason for residency
 Entering the United States at a legal port of entry
 Not being a public charge

The Cuban Adjustment Act remains in the books with little modification. Migration flow and control has been a long standing pawn in U.S. Cuba relations, and there is not enough domestic clamor in the U.S. for the U.S. government to concede to Cuba's demands to eliminate the law, according to expert Prof. Michael Bustamante.

1996 and 2017 changes
In 1996, the U.S. government introduced the so-called "wet feet, dry feet policy" which limited the scope of the Act. The wet foot/dry foot policy was rescinded by President Obama at the end of his presidency in January 2017.  The Cuban Adjustment Act (Ley de Ajuste Cubano) remains in force.

References

Sources
Cuban Adjustment Act as of 1966
US Department of State
U.S. Citizenship and Immigration Services
 Is the Cuban Adjustment Law in Trouble ? - Michael J. Bustamente 

United States federal immigration and nationality legislation
Cuba–United States relations